William Crawford (1760October 23, 1823) was a member of the United States House of Representatives from Pennsylvania and a slaveholder.

Crawford was born in Paisley, Scotland, in 1760.  He received a liberal schooling, studied medicine at the University of Edinburgh, and in 1781 received his degree.  He emigrated to the United States and settled near Gettysburg, Pennsylvania.  He purchased a farm on Marsh Creek in 1785, where he spent the rest of his life practicing medicine.  He was an associate judge for Adams County, Pennsylvania, from 1801 to 1808.

Crawford was elected as a Democratic-Republican to the Eleventh and to the three succeeding Congresses.  He again resumed the practice of medicine near Gettysburg where he died in 1823.  Interment in Evergreen Cemetery in Gettysburg.

References

Sources

The Political Graveyard

...

1760 births
1823 deaths
Politicians from Paisley, Renfrewshire
British emigrants to the United States
American people of Scottish descent
Democratic-Republican Party members of the United States House of Representatives from Pennsylvania
Pennsylvania state court judges
American slave owners
People from Adams County, Pennsylvania
18th-century Scottish medical doctors
19th-century Scottish medical doctors
19th-century American physicians
Alumni of the University of Edinburgh
Burials at Evergreen Cemetery (Adams County, Pennsylvania)